Ritya postcode 5370 is a village in Dryanovo Municipality, in Gabrovo Province, in northern central Bulgaria.

Ritya Glacier in Antarctica is named after the village.

References

Villages in Gabrovo Province